is the 46th single by Japanese entertainer Akina Nakamori. Written by Karen and Hitoshi Haba, the single was released on May 17, 2006, by Universal Sigma. It was also the lead single from her 22nd studio album Destination.

Background 
"Hana yo Odore" was used as the ending theme song of the NTV drama series , which also starred Nakamori. The jacket cover is an illustration of Nakamori as a child ballerina, as she has practiced ballet since childhood.

Chart performance 
"Hana yo Odore" peaked at No. 23 on Oricon's weekly singles chart and sold over 10,400 copies.

Track listing

Charts

References

External links 
 
 
 

2006 singles
2006 songs
Akina Nakamori songs
Japanese-language songs
Japanese television drama theme songs
Universal Sigma singles